Sergio Vatta (4 October 1937 – 23 July 2020) was an Italian football player, coach and sports director. As a player he played for Triestina and in the Italian Serie C with L'Aquila. He coached Torino F.C. in the Italian Serie B. He then coached, among others, Torino's youth team and the Italy women's national football team. As a sports director he won the 2000–01 championship with S.S. Lazio Youth Sector.

Called il Mago (the Magician) he is especially known for his work in the youth sector, and is considered an historic coach of Torino's youth sector, discovering such talents as Dino Baggio, Benito Carbone, Sandro Cois, Roberto Cravero, Diego Fuser, Gianluigi Lentini, Andrea Mandorlini, Giuseppe Pancaro, Roberto Rambaudi and Christian Vieri.

He died on 23 July 2020.

References

1937 births
2020 deaths
Sportspeople from Zadar
Italian footballers
Association football midfielders
U.S. Triestina Calcio 1918 players
Serie C players
Italian football managers
Italy women's national football team managers
Torino F.C. non-playing staff
S.S. Lazio non-playing staff